Rivanna Junction is the second full-length album by Tim Barry.  It was released in the United States on November 21, 2006.

Track listing
 "Trash Inspirations" - 3:04
 "Avoiding Catatonic Surrender" - 3:36
 "Dog Bumped" - 4:17
 "Church of Level Track" - 3:28
 "Exit Wounds" - 4:22
 "Cardinal In Red Bed" - 3:26
 "Shoulda Oughta" - 2:16
 "Steel Road" - 4:02
 "C'mon Quinn" - 2:57
 "Wait At Milano" - 4:49

Notes

2006 albums
Tim Barry albums